Cadwalader Hughes was a Welsh  Anglican priest in the late 16th and early 17th centuries.

Hughes was educated at Balliol College, Oxford. He held livings at Heathfield, Bridgwater, Skilgate and Milverton. He was  Archdeacon of Llandaff from 1601 to 1616.

References

Archdeacons of Llandaff
16th-century Welsh Anglican priests
17th-century Welsh Anglican priests
Alumni of Balliol College, Oxford